Badehotellet (English: Seaside Hotel) is a Danish drama comedy series that has been running on TV 2 since 2013. The show's plot line starts in mid-1928. Seasons 1 through 5 each follow a summer hotel season in the years 1928 through 1932. Season 6 through 8 each follow a summer season in the years 1939 through 1941. Season 9 aired in 2022 and depicted the summer of 1945.

From 2016 through 2020, the series was the most watched fictional series on Danish television.

Main cast and characters

References

External links
 
 Official series archive
 

2010s comedy-drama television series
2010s Danish television series
2013 Danish television series debuts
Danish comedy television series
Danish drama television series
Danish-language television shows
Television series set in hotels
Television series set in the 1920s
Television series set in the 1930s
Television series set in the 1940s
Television shows set in Denmark
TV 2 (Denmark) original programming